Uriel del Toro (born 10 August 1978) is a Mexican actor and model. He has carried out exclusive advertising campaigns in Barcelona, Madrid, Hamburg and Milan for brands such as Diesel, Armani and Levi's. He has also worked for Aghata Ruiz de la Prada, Prototype, Nike, Adidas, Calvin Klein and Pepe Jeans among others. During the Fashion Week Mexico 2008 has been awarded the prize for "Best Male Model". On television he has been known for his characters in telenovelas as La que no podía amar, La Impostora, Mariposa de Barrio, and Al otro lado del muro.

Filmography

References

External links 
 

1978 births
Living people
21st-century Mexican male actors
Mexican male film actors
Mexican male telenovela actors
Mexican male television actors
Mexican male models
People from Mexico City